Edward Synan may refer to:
 Edward A. Synan (1918–1997), American philosopher and theologian
 Edward John Synan (1820–1887), Irish politician